Hedy Op. 43, is an 1896 Czech-language opera by Zdeněk Fibich in 4 acts to a libretto by  after Byron's Don Juan.

Recordings
Hedy, act 3: "Jsem-li hricka moci pekla"" recorded by Zdeněk Otava

References

1896 operas
Operas by Zdeněk Fibich
Czech-language operas
Operas